The Christ the King Church Also called the Catholic Church of Christ the King or simply Catholic Church of Arubo, is a religious building affiliated with the Catholic Church located in the town of Arubo in the district of Ewa north of the island of Nauru, a Country of Oceania.

The church follows the Roman or Latin rite and is within the Diocese of Tarawa and Nauru (Dioecesis Taravanus et Naurunus) which began as apostolic vicariate in 1897 and was elevated to its current status in November 1966 by the bull "Prophetarum voes" of the pope Paul VI.

In 2014 the church held a religious service of various Christian denominations to commemorate the World Day of Disabled Persons,  and by January 2016 the church was selected as one of the places where the 48th anniversary of the Independence of Nauru from Australia.

See also
Roman Catholicism in Nauru
Christ the King

References

Roman Catholic churches in Nauru